Cerezo de Abajo is a municipality located in the province of Segovia, Castile and León, Spain.

At the end of the Spanish Civil War it was the site of a Nationalist concentration camp housing more than 5,000 Republican prisoners.

See also
 Cerezo de Arriba

References

Municipalities in the Province of Segovia